Sylvia Helena de Figueiredo Steiner (born 1953) is a Brazilian judge who was a member of the International Criminal Court from 2003 to 2016.

Career
Steiner graduated from the Law School of University of São Paulo and studied later at the University of Brasília.  She acted as Federal Public Prosecutor from 1982 to 1995 in São Paulo. In 1995, she was appointed as a judge of the Tribunal Regional Federal da 3ª Região, a federal court headquartered at São Paulo.

Steiner was a member of the Brazilian delegation to the Preparatory Commission of the International Criminal Court from 1999 to 2002. She was also a member of the Official Working Group on the Implementation of the Rome Statute in 2003, in Brazil.

Judge of the International Criminal Court, 2003–2016
Between 2005 and 2016, Steiner served as the presiding judge of the trial chamber for the case of Jean-Pierre Bemba, the first case in which the ICC has found a high official directly responsible for the crimes of his subordinates, as well as the first to focus primarily on crimes of sexual violence committed in war. She left the court in 2016, and the Bemba judgement was overturned on appeal  and gave rise to a compensation claim on the part of the accused on the basis that trial mismanagement had contributed to a miscarriage of justice.

Other activities
 Brazilian Institute for Criminal Sciences (IBCCRIM), Founding Associate Member 
 Brazilian Criminal Sciences Journal, Deputy Director
 Brazilian Judges for Democracy Association, Member
 Brazilian Section of the International Commission of Jurists, Member of the Executive Council

Publications
 A convenção americana sobre direitos humanos e sua integração ao processo penal brasileiro. (2000) São Paulo, Editora Revista dos Tribunais.  - in Portuguese

Notes

External links
 Brasileira comporá tribunal internacional, Feb 5, 2003, Ministry of External Relations, Government of Brazil - in Portuguese

Brazilian women judges
20th-century Brazilian judges
International Criminal Court judges
University of São Paulo alumni
People from São Paulo
Brazilian people of German descent
Living people
1953 births
Brazilian judges of international courts and tribunals
21st-century Brazilian judges
20th-century women judges
21st-century women judges